The ECi O-320 is part of a family of normally aspirated, air-cooled, four-cylinder, direct-drive engines developed for certified and experimental aircraft. Its cylinders are arranged in horizontally opposed configuration and a displacement of 320 cubic inches (5.24 L). It is based on the Lycoming O-320 engine with ECi cylinder assemblies.

Design and development
ECi developed engine kits starting in 1995.

Variants

O-320 series
ECi O-320 
 at 2700 rpm, Minimum fuel grade 100/100LL avgas, compression ratio 7.0:1. Certified Applications
ECi OX-320 
 at 2700 rpm, Minimum fuel grade 100/100LL avgas, compression ratio 7.0:1. Experimental Variant
ECi IOX-320 
 at 2700 rpm, Minimum fuel grade 100/100LL avgas, compression ratio 7.0:1. Feul Injected Experimental

Applications

Specifications (ECi O-320)

See also
List of aircraft engines

References

External links

Boxer engines